Variety on View was a British television programme which aired for a total of six episodes from 1946 to 1947 on the BBC. It was a live variety telecast from the Bedford Theatre, with music hall acts of various kinds. The series is missing, believed lost.

References

External links
Variety on View on IMDb

1940s British television series
1946 British television series debuts
1947 British television series endings
Lost BBC episodes
BBC Television shows
Black-and-white British television shows
British variety television shows
British live television series